WARQ (93.5 FM) is a radio station licensed to Columbia, South Carolina and serves the Columbia market. The Alpha Media outlet is licensed by the Federal Communications Commission (FCC) to broadcast with an effective radiated power (ERP) of 2.8 kW.  Its studios are on Pineview Road in Columbia, while the transmitter tower is located atop the Capitol Center building at 1201 Main Street. The station currently airs a Top 40/CHR format branded as "Live 93.5".

WARQ broadcasts in the HD Radio (hybrid) format.

History
WARQ signed on the air as WXRY on February 6, 1971 in mono with a Beautiful/Easy Listening music format. Later, the station converted to FM stereo, still with a Beautiful/Easy Listening music format supplied on reel to reel tape by Schulke.

In 1983, the station adopted the call letters WCEZ and maintained the Beautiful/Easy Listening format, with the slogan "The Beautiful Place to Be" and "Easy 93 WCEZ."

Shortly after the sale of then WCEZ (along with sister WVOC) to Ridgley Communications, the station abandoned the automated reel-to-reel Beautiful/Easy Listening format to a light rock format that incorporated more vocals and fewer traditional instrumentals. WCEZ then adopted the moniker "Lite 93.5" and began broadcasting a satellite-delivered light rock format supplied by Westwood One known internally as "Format 41."

Ridgley Communications later filed for bankruptcy protection and a private ownership group in the Fall of 1989 purchased WCEZ/WVOC out of bankruptcy. The group of owners, which included Olympia Networks Steve Bunyard and broadcast veteran Rick Dames, organized and operated the stations under the Clayton Radio name.

In January 1990, Clayton Radio replaced Format 41 with a Gold-based "WARM" AC format developed by McVay Media. The station adopted the moniker "Star 93.5" and the call letters WAAS. As unfortunate as the transpositions were, the call letters were designed to put the station at the top of the Arbitron rating service list of stations and stood for "We Are Always Shining." The jingles used by WAAS were customized versions of JAM's "Q-Cuts" package.

By 1992, WAAS was at a crossroads. The station was experiencing financial difficulties as well as a ratings battle with 2 other ACs in the market, WTCB and WSCQ (now known as WXBT). That August, the station, in a rather bold move, dropped AC for Active Rock (with select Classic rock cuts) under the "Rock 93.5" handle. The new call letters became WARQ and the station set out to battle established Album rock/Classic rock hybrid WMFX for the rock audience.

In early 1995, WARQ was sold to new owners and the studios were moved with new sister station WWDM. When the move was completed, a brief stunt was done on April Fools' Day when WARQ dropped Album Rock for Hip hop as "93 Jamz" for about an hour. After the stunting was done, "Rock 93.5" was relaunched with a new on-air slogan "Real Rock".  At that point, the station segued toward a more Active/Alternative Rock hybrid, but would eventually become a full Alternative station by early 1996 dropping the "Real Rock" slogan in the process for "Columbia's Rock Alternative".

In 1999, a new handle known as "Channel 93.5" was adopted by Clear Channel. This lasted until 2004, when the "Rock 93.5" moniker was reclaimed after Inner City Broadcasting bought it.

From 2000 to 2003, WARQ hosted the Fallout concerts at Finlay Park, featuring popular bands of the time like Incubus and Our Lady Peace. WARQ hosted Fallout again from 2009-2012 outside of the now abandoned Jillian's bar in the Vista, and hosted Springout from 2010-'13 there also. Their lineup for Fallout '09 was Atlanta's Collective Soul (for their Collective Soul album, Atlanta's Cartel, and Charleston's Deepfield. In 2010, Fallout had Tennessee's Fuel, Jacksonville's Red Jumpsuit Apparatus, and Athens' Dead Confederate. In 2011, Fallout had Canada's Theory of a Deadman and Michigan's Pop Evil. In 2012, Fallout had Mississippi's Saving Abel, Charlotte's Paper Tongues, and Columbia's Weaving the Fate (Villanova). In 2010, WARQ's Springout had California's Papa Roach and Florida's Nonpoint. In 2011, Springout had Kentucky's Cage the Elephant and Atlanta's Manchester Orchestra (for their Simple Math album). In 2012, Springout had Awolnation and Neon Trees. In 2013, Springout had Jacksonville's Shinedown.

The station was owned for a bit by YMF Media LLC through licensee YMF Media South Carolina Licensee LLC. It is now owned by Alpha Media (formerly known as L&L Broadcasting) as of late 2013, which also bought Urban Contemporary WHXT, Urban AC WWDM, Modern rock WMFX, and Sports WOIC in the Columbia radio market at the time of purchase.

On March 21, 2014, after playing "Say Goodbye" by Theory of a Deadman, WARQ began stunting with a loop directing listeners to sister station WMFX. On March 24, at Midnight, WARQ ended stunting and changed their format to hot AC, branded as "Q93.5". However, the station gradually morphed into a Mainstream Top 40 by 2017

On July 2, 2021, WARQ rebranded as "Live 93.5".

WARQ-HD2
WARQ's new HD2 station "Rock 99.7" (launched around Christmas 2016) plays active rock and modern rock, with only 2 minutes of commercials. They play 90s, 00s, 10s, and new alternative rock, like Rock 93.5 did. Then, it later rebranded to ALT 99.7.

Previous logos

References

External links

ARQ
Radio stations established in 1971
1971 establishments in South Carolina
Alpha Media radio stations
Contemporary hit radio stations in the United States